Diretmoides is a genus of spinyfins with one species (pauciradiatus) known from the eastern Atlantic Ocean and the other (veriginae) known from the eastern Indian Ocean.

Species
There are currently two recognized species in this genus:
 Diretmoides pauciradiatus (Woods, 1973) (Longwing spinyfin)
 Diretmoides veriginae Kotlyar, 1987

References

Diretmidae
Marine fish genera
Taxa named by Alfred Post (zoologist)
Taxa named by Jean-Claude Quéro